Ana Ivanovic was the defending champion, but she lost in the quarterfinals to Dominika Cibulková.

Agnieszka Radwańska won the title, defeating Belinda Bencic in the final, 6–2, 6–2.

Seeds
The top four seeds received a bye into the second round.

Draw

Finals

Top half

Bottom half

Qualifying

Seeds

Qualifiers

Qualifying draw

First qualifier

Second qualifier

Third qualifier

Fourth qualifier

References
Main Draw
Qualifying Draw

Singles